Car Craft was a magazine devoted to automobiles, hot rodding, and drag racing. It was published by the Motor Trend Group. It was established in 1953. The magazine published articles directed at inexperienced and expert car mechanics, such as rebuilding a carburetor.

The motto of the magazine was Loud, Fast, Real, which emphasized its more budget-oriented approach to automobile building. When compared to similar magazines, Car Craft often featured vehicles built on a "real world" budget, with an emphasis on functionality over style. Sister publication Hot Rod overlapped to an extent on some of the same subject matter, however Hot Rod covered more professionally built vehicles.

One of the editors-in-chief was John Mcgann. Previous editors included Rick Voegelin, Jon Asher, Jeff Smith, John Baechtel, Chuck Schifsky, Matt King, David Freiburger and Douglas Glad. Car Craft named an annual All-Star drag racing team each year plus a lifetime achievement award.

On December 9, 2019, MotorTrend publisher TEN Publishing announced that they will cease publishing of Car Craft, alongside 18 other magazines. March 2020 was the final issue of the magazine.

References

External links
 Official Car Craft Website

Motor Trend Group
Automobile magazines published in the United States
Monthly magazines published in the United States
Defunct magazines published in the United States
Magazines established in 1953
Magazines disestablished in 2020
Magazines published in Los Angeles